Ekholmen Castle is a castle in Sweden.

See also
List of castles in Sweden

References

Castles in Uppsala County